The Monastery of Saint Translators (Surb Targmanchats Vank) is an Armenian monastery, founded in the 4th century. It is located north of Dashkasan, in Azerbaijan.

The Monastery was founded by Saints Mesrop Mashtots and Sahak Partev. In 411 they translated the Bible from Syriac.

History

According to some sources the monastery was built in the end of the 4th century and the beginning of the 5th century. In 989 and 1845 the monastery was reconstructed. The monastery rose during the reign of bishop Gabriel Harutunyan. During his reign, many people from near villages help monastery. The new rose of monastery was during the reign of Stepanos Balyants, in the 1830s. It is known that in 1839, monk Grigor Ter-Hovhannesyants three times served as a priest. In 1849 archimandrite Sargis had followed archimandrite Hovhannes.

In northeast of the monastery is located a vaulted barn.

Name 
The Monastery of Saint Translators (Surb Targmanchats) received its name because on its wall Mesrop Mashtots and Sahak Partev translated the Bible from Syriac.

Description

Church 
The main church of the complex is dated to 1630. The church consists of one vaulted rom with an apse in the east, between the two small rooms. 
Around the nave of the church is located gavit (for porch in Armenian), which stretches west from nave as well. Two-storeyed tower, built of carved stone, is adjacent to the porch to the south and leads to the main entrance of the church. The hall is located north of the church, which probably served as a place of worship - sacristy.

The cells 
At 5 meters to the east of the church, there are cells of the monks, looking west. The cells are 6 vaulted rooms, each has an entrance and a window looking west. To the south-east of cells from north to south stretches dining. From the south to the dining room adjoins a similar room, most likely served as a kitchen. 
The cells of the monks built in the same style as the whole church, were built in 1630 from. Barn and dining room were attached with archimandrite Stepanos in 1830s.

Current status 
The monastery complex is in a state of collapse.

See also 
 List of Armenian churches in Azerbaijan

References 

Armenian churches in Azerbaijan
Ruined abbeys and monasteries
Ruins in Azerbaijan